Acacia dacrydioides is a shrub belonging to the genus Acacia and the subgenus Juliflorae that is endemic to north western Australia.

Description
It has terete villous branchlets that are fawn to red-brown in colour. Like many species of Acacia it has phyllodes instead of true leaves.

Following flowering glabrous seed pods for that resemble a string of beads with dark red to brown ribbed valves form.

Distribution
It is native to an area in the Kimberley region of Western Australia where it is found on ridges amongst rocks in areas of sandstone and quartzite. The bulk of the population is found in the King Edward River district around the Kalumburu Mission where it is usually part of mixed woodland communities on ridges or on river banks in deep sand.

See also
List of Acacia species

References

dacrydioides
Acacias of Western Australia
Plants described in 1975
Taxa named by Mary Tindale